Arthur Edwin Griffiths (1885 – 1944) was an English footballer who played in the Football League for Oldham Athletic and Stoke.

Career
Griffiths was born in Stoke-upon-Trent and joined Stoke from Hartshill in 1904. He made his debut for Stoke at the age of 20 and scored his first goal against Everton on 3 April 1906. When Stoke went out the Football League at the end of the 1907–08 due to heavy finical problems Griffiths left and signed for Second Division side Oldham Athletic. After scoring just 4 goals for the "Latics" in 1908–09 he returned to Stoke and in 1909–10 he had a prolific season in front of goal scoring 38 goals in all competitions. He could not maintain his run in front of goal however and in the next two seasons he scored 13 goals. He left in 1913 to play for Welsh side Wrexham.

Career statistics
Source:

References

English footballers
Stoke City F.C. players
Oldham Athletic A.F.C. players
Wrexham A.F.C. players
English Football League players
1885 births
Footballers from Stoke-on-Trent
1944 deaths
Association football forwards